Fetch the Vet is a British stop motion children's television programme created by Gail Penston and Stephen Thraves. 26 episodes were produced by Cosgrove Hall Films, Flextech Television, and London Weekend Television for ITV's children's strand CITV. The show concerned Tom Fetch, who lived in the countryside working as a vet and was respected by everyone because of his duties to help cure injured or sick animals.

List of episodes

Series 1

Series 2

References

External links
Official site

2000 British television series debuts
2001 British television series endings
2000s British children's television series
British children's animated adventure television series
ITV children's television shows
English-language television shows
British stop-motion animated television series
Television series by ITV Studios
London Weekend Television shows
2000s British animated television series
Television series by Cosgrove Hall Films